Katherine Horny (born 26 January 1969) is a volleyball player from Peru, who played for the Peru women's national volleyball team. She won a silver medal at the 1988 Seoul Summer Olympics.

References

1969 births
Living people
Olympic volleyball players of Peru
Volleyball players at the 1988 Summer Olympics
Olympic silver medalists for Peru
Peruvian women's volleyball players
Olympic medalists in volleyball
Medalists at the 1988 Summer Olympics
20th-century Peruvian women